Svartsjö is a smaller locality in Ekerö Municipality, Stockholm County, southeastern Sweden.

See also
Svartsjö Palace
Svartsjö County

References

Populated places in Ekerö Municipality
Uppland